The Abagana Ambush (March 31, 1968) was an ambush by Biafran guerrilla troops led by Major Jonathan Uchendu  that wiped out the Nigerian 2 Division. Of the 6,000 Nigerian troops ambushed, only a very small number survived, including the 2nd Division's commander, General Murtala Muhammed.

Background
On 4 October 1967, the Nigerian 2nd Division began bombarding Onitsha and continued the assault for eight days, before a 10 boat armada crossed the Niger River into the city. The occupying Nigerians didn't pursue retreating Biafran soldiers and instead opted to loot and burn the Onitsha market to the ground. The Biafran 11th and 18th Battalions under Major Joseph Achuzie and Col. Assam Nsudoh formed a pincer and attacked Onitsha from two directions, capturing and killing most Nigerian soldiers. 

In December 1967 the Nigerian 2nd Division and the 6th Battalion crossed the Niger River at Idah and began making their way towards Onitsha, finally capturing the city after several attempts. The Nigerian Forces now intended to link up the 1st Division at Enugu with the 2nd Division at Onitsha. To this end the Nigerian 2nd Division moved out towards Enugu, in a long convoy supported by armored cars, on the 31st day of March 1968.

Ambush
On 31 March 1968, a convoy consisting of 106 vehicles belonging to the Nigerian 2nd Division transporting 6,000 soldiers, as well as armour from Onitsha to Enugu was ambushed and decimated in the town of Abagana by a small unit of Biafran soldiers led by Major Jonathan Uchendu. 

Homemade Ogbunigwe rocket missiles were launched by the Biafrans at a tanker truck carrying gasoline which caused an enormous explosion destroying many of the convoy's armoured vehicles and killing a large number of Nigerian troops. 350 tons of Nigerian Army equipment were destroyed or captured by the Biafran troops. After the rocket attack the Biafran soldiers opened fire on the convoy with small arms fire killing many more Nigerian soldiers. It was during this ambush that the Nigerian army suffered the heaviest single loss in the civil war.

Aftermath
The successful ambush at Abagana gave both Biafran soldiers and civilians hope in the war as well as temporarily halting the Nigerian advance into Biafran territory. General Murtala Muhammed was relieved of his command and never commanded a division again.

In his own words, Uchendu said the sight of the convoy almost paralyzed his troops. His boys were so anxious to start firing, more out of panic than anything else. He asked them to remain calm until he gave the command. He allowed much of the Nigerian 2 Division convoy to pass through. His boys were shocked why he would allow them go through into the Biafran held zone. They were nervous and suspicious, yet they trusted his military gallantry and so awaited to know his strategy. He said they concluded that the war was over, but as brave soldiers, they must fight to the last!

As he was guiding the soldier with the rocket launcher on what to do to the invading convoy and when best to strike, the soldier accidentally pressed the trigger, letting go of the rocket. Luckily, he hit a fuel tanker. The tanker exploded and threw its contents onto a nearby armour carrier setting everything ablaze, causing multiple explosions.

In panic, soldiers who already crossed over into the Biafran line ran in different directions in total confusion. The Biafran soldiers attacked. They radioed the regular troops and they joined in the attack. When Uchendu learned that Muritala Muhammed was with the convoy and somewhere in Nawfia, he set off hurriedly to capture him but was late as Muritala was sighted taking off with a helicopter.

Notes 

Major Jonathan Uchendu carried out the attack. His 39 Battalion was an offshoot of 18 Battalion commanded by Col. Nsodor.

References

Conflicts in 1968
Nigerian Civil War
Battles involving Nigeria
1968 in Nigeria
March 1968 events in Africa